Fairleigh Dickinson University is a private university with its main campuses in Madison, New Jersey. Founded in 1942, Fairleigh Dickinson University offers more than 100 degree programs. In addition to two campuses in New Jersey, the university has a campus in Vancouver, BC, one in the United Kingdom, and an online platform. Fairleigh Dickinson University is New Jersey's largest private institution of higher education, with over 12,000 students.

History
Fairleigh Dickinson University was founded as the Fairleigh Dickinson Junior College in 1942 as a junior college by Peter Sammartino and wife Sally, and was named after an early benefactor Colonel Fairleigh S. Dickinson, co-founder of Becton Dickinson. Its original campus was located in Rutherford, NJ. By 1948, Fairleigh Dickinson Junior College expanded its curriculum to offer a four-year program when the GI Bill and veterans' money encouraged it to redesignate itself as Fairleigh Dickinson College. In that same year, the school received accreditation from the Middle States Association of Colleges and Schools. In 1956, the institution was recognized as Fairleigh Dickinson University by the New Jersey State Board of Education. In 1958, the university acquired the former Twombly-Vanderbilt estate in Madison and Florham Park, New Jersey, to serve as its third campus. Fairleigh Dickinson University is a member of the National Association of Independent Colleges and Universities.

Landscape architect Frederick Law Olmsted, the designer of Central Park, was also commissioned to design the landscape for the Twombly-Vanderbilt estate (now the Florham Campus). The main house of the Twombly-Vanderbilt estate, now Hennessy Hall, was designed by architectural firm McKim, Mead, and White in the Georgian Revival style. The mansion was completed in 1897 and was modeled after the wing of Hampton Court Palace designed by architect Sir Christopher Wren. The Friends of Florham, founded in 1990 by Emma Joy Dana, university librarian James Fraser, and a group of friends and colleagues works with the mission of advising and assisting the administration and board of trustees in the care, maintenance, and preservation of the Twombly Estate, known as "Florham".

Presidents

* indicates those who served only as an acting or interim president.

Campuses
Fairleigh Dickinson University has four campuses: two in New Jersey (Madison/Florham Park and Teaneck/Hackensack), one in Vancouver, British Columbia, and one in South East England, as well as an online platform.

Florham Campus

The Florham Campus is located in the suburban towns of Madison and Florham Park, New Jersey, on the grounds of the former Florham estate of Hamilton McKown Twombly (1849–1910) and his wife, Florence Adele Vanderbilt Twombly (1854–1952), a member of the wealthy Vanderbilt family.

The Florham Campus finished construction on the John and Joan Monninger Center for Learning and Research. It opened during the spring 2013 semester. Student enrollment at the Florham Campus consists of over 2,757 undergraduates coupled with 690 graduate students giving a total of 3,417 students. The full-time equivalence (FTE) for undergraduates on the campus is 2,481. The FTE for graduates on campus is 796.

Metropolitan Campus
The Metropolitan Campus, close to New York City and spanning the Hackensack River in Teaneck and Hackensack, New Jersey, has a greater focus on business and professional majors compared to the Florham Campus. The Metropolitan Campus has 5,734 undergraduates and 1,748 graduate students, with an undergraduate full-time equivalence (FTE) of 3,003. 21% of Metropolitan Campus students are minority and international students. Approximately one thousand students live on campus in the residence halls.

Wroxton College

Farleigh Dickinson University's Wroxton College is located in Wroxton, Oxfordshire, in South East England. When Fairleigh Dickinson University acquired Wroxton Abbey in 1965, FDU became the first American university to own and operate a campus, Wroxton College, outside of the United States. Although Wroxton College dates to the 18th century, the housing has been modernized.

Vancouver Campus
FDU's Vancouver Campus is located at 842 Cambie Street and 89 West Georgia Street in Vancouver, British Columbia. It opened in 2007.

Former campuses
In addition to the present campuses, Fairleigh Dickinson University previously operated campuses in Rutherford, New Jersey (where the university was founded in 1942) and in Saint Croix, U.S. Virgin Islands. Operations on the Rutherford Campus were merged with the Metropolitan Campus in 1993.  The Rutherford Campus was sold to Felician College in 1997. The West Indies Laboratory which opened in 1972 was damaged beyond repair during Hurricane Hugo in 1989 and was closed shortly afterwards in 1990.

Academics
Fairleigh Dickinson's national student body consists of a total 10,899 students, 8,461 of whom are undergraduates and the remaining 2,438 are graduate students with a full-time equivalence (FTE) of 7,434, making it the largest private institution in the state of New Jersey.  FDU has over 1,100 international students from approximately 17 countries around the world ranking it 15th nationally among their Carnegie peer group. The majority of international students attend the Metropolitan Campus and FDU's Vancouver Campus, which was founded primarily to educate international students. The Vancouver Campus is the first U.S.–owned and operated institution in British Columbia to receive University status.

The university is ranked 44th by U.S. News & World Report Best Colleges 2022 Regional University rankings (North).

Fairleigh Dickinson consists of two academic colleges: the Maxwell Becton College of Arts and Sciences and the Silberman College of Business, along with seven independent schools: the Gildart Hasse School of Computer Sciences and Engineering; the Peter Sammartino School of Education; the International School of Hospitality, Sports, and Tourism Management; the Henry P. Becton School of Nursing and Allied Health; the School of Pharmacy and Health Sciences; the School of Psychology and Counseling; and the School of Public and Global Affairs.

Becton College of Arts and Sciences 
Fairleigh Dickinson's Becton College offers just over sixty undergraduate majors to its full and part-time students.

Silberman College of Business 
The Silberman College of Business is a tri-campus college of Fairleigh Dickinson University. It offers graduate and undergraduate degrees at the Florham Campus, the Metropolitan campus, and offers bachelor's degree studies in Business Management and Information Technology at the FDU-Vancouver campus.

FDU offers AACSB-accredited graduate and undergraduate business degrees through its Silberman College of Business. Fairleigh Dickinson's Silberman College of Business was ranked as one of the top 295 business schools in the country for 2014 by The Princeton Review.

Fairleigh Dickinson University's International School of Hospitality and Tourism Management features the US national headquarters of the international gastronomic society Confrérie de la Chaîne des Rôtisseurs located at the Chaîne House on the Florham Campus.

Graduate studies
Graduate programs are offered at all four of the university's campuses, and a number are offered solely through online delivery, including a postdoctoral MS in clinical psychopharmacology (MSCP) through the School of Psychology and Counseling. Graduate studies include the Doctor of Pharmacy (PharmD) offered by the School of Pharmacy and Health Sciences, the Doctor of Nursing Practice (DNP), the Doctor of Philosophy (PhD) in clinical psychology, the Doctor of Psychology (PsyD) in school psychology, and a large number of master's degree programs, including the Master of Public Administration (MPA) and an MA in global affairs offered to nearby consular and diplomatic staff.

FDU School of Pharmacy
In 2012, Fairleigh Dickinson opened New Jersey's first school of pharmacy associated with a private higher education institution, at the Florham Campus. It is the second pharmacy school in New Jersey and the first to open in the state in over 120 years.

FDU School of Public and Global Affairs
After a major gift from alumnus James Orefice in 2017, Fairleigh Dickinson formed a new graduate School of Public and Global Affairs comprising the Master of Public Administration, the Master of Administrative Science, the M.A. in Global Affairs, the M.S. in Cyber and Homeland Security Administration, the Master of Arts in Higher Education Administration, and the survey research group, PublicMind.

FDU Libraries 
The university maintains libraries on all four of its campuses. Between the three libraries and one archive located at FDU's Florham  and Metropolitan campuses, the university library system holds over 450,000 titles.

The Florham Campus library is part of the John and Joan Monninger Center for Learning and Research. A portion of the library is housed in the old Orangerie of the Twombly-Vanderbilt estate which was built in the 1890s by McKim, Mead, and White.

The Metropolitan campus features the Metropolitan Library, the Business Reference Library in Dickinson Hall, and the North Jersey Heritage Center (an archival collection of New Jersey books, documents, maps, newspapers and reference material, as well as FDU history). The New Jersey collection began in 1961 when FDU became one of the earliest participants in the New Jersey Document Program listed as fourth in precedence out of 80 depositories behind the Council of State Government, Rutgers University and the NJ State Library. The Metropolitan Library holds the Columbia Pictures Archive, a collection of over 230 movies from the Columbia Pictures Studios on 16mm film. The archive was given by Columbia in the 1980s to FDU through the work of Jack Kells, FDU alum and former Columbia executive.

Athletics

In intercollegiate athletics, the Metropolitan Campus competes in NCAA Division I, while the Florham Campus competes in Division III, making it one of only a few schools in the United States to field both Division I and Division III teams. The teams at the Metropolitan Campus are known as the Knights, while the Florham Campus teams are known as the Devils.

On March 17, 2023, the Fairleigh Dickinson University men's basketball team became the second team in history to upset a 1 seed as a 16 seed against Purdue in the 2023 NCAA Division I men's basketball tournament.

Florham Campus – NCAA Division III

The FDU Florham Campus sports teams are called the Devils. They are in NCAA Division III and the Eastern College Athletic Conference (ECAC) and they compete in the Middle Atlantic Conferences' (MAC) MAC Freedom. The women's basketball team won the national collegiate basketball championship in the year 2013–2014. The Women's basketball team also made it to the NCAA tournament four times in a row from the year 2012 to 2016. Their mascot is Ian the Devil.

Devils Division III Athletics

PublicMind
Fairleigh Dickinson University's PublicMind is an independent research group that conducts public opinion polling and other research on politics, society, popular culture, consumer behavior and economic trends.  PublicMind associates undertake scientific survey research for corporations, non-profits, and government agencies as well as for the public interest, as well as information regarding the FDU community as a whole.

Notable alumni

 Stephanie Adams (1970–2018), model, writer and murderer.
 Alejandro Bedoya (born 1987), professional soccer player for Nantes in France and a U.S. International (did not graduate).
 Brenda Blackmon, television news anchor for WPIX.
 Ron Blomberg (born 1948), baseball player who played for the New York Yankees.
 Lisa Blunt Rochester (born 1962), member of the U.S. House of Representatives for Delaware's at-large congressional district.
 Mensun Bound (born 1953), marine archaeologist.
 Ron Brill, co-founder of Home Depot.
 Tomer Chencinski (born 1984), Israeli-Canadian football player.
 Katlyn Chookagian (born 1988), professional Mixed Martial Artist, current UFC Flyweight
 Richard Codey (born 1946), former governor and state senate president of New Jersey.
 Nicholas Felice (born 1927), politician who served in the New Jersey General Assembly and was mayor of Fair Lawn.
 Marcus Gaither (1961–2020), American-French basketball player.
 Charles A. Gargano (born 1934), former U.S. Ambassador to Trinidad and Tobago and chairman of the Empire State Development Corporation.
 Gilbert M. Gaul (born 1951), Pulitzer Prize winning journalist.
 John Gottman (born 1942), Professor Emeritus of Psychology at the University of Washington in Seattle.
 Reinaldo Marcus Green (born 1981), filmmaker and writer who directed the film King Richard
 Seth Greenberg (born 1956), former Virginia Tech Hokies head basketball coach and current ESPN personality.
 Mike Hall (born 1989), bassist. 
 Sung-Mo Kang, president of Korea Advanced Institute of Science and Technology.
 Jim Keogh, (born 1948), author of nearly 100 books sold worldwide introduced PC programming nationally in his Popular Electronics Magazine column in 1982.
 Eleanor Kieliszek (1925–2017; B.A. 1979), politician, first woman chosen as Mayor of Teaneck, New Jersey.
 Garry Kitchen (born 1955; B.S. 1980), video game pioneer.
 Stewart Krentzman, president and CEO of Oki Data Americas, Inc.
 John Legere (born 1958), former CEO of T-Mobile.
 William Leiss, president of the Royal Society of Canada from 1999 to 2001 and Officer of the Order of Canada.
 Jacob Lissek (born 1992), soccer player.
 George Martin (born 1953), former defensive end for the New York Giants, who is Executive Director NFL Alumni Association.
 Yahya Maroofi, Former Secretary General of the Economic Cooperation Organization
 D. Bennett Mazur (1924–1994), member of the New Jersey General Assembly.
 Danielle McEwan (born 1991), ten-pin bowler and PWBA title holder
 John J. Mooney (1930–2020), co-inventor of the three-way catalytic converter and co-winner of National Medal of Technology.
 Vince Naimoli (1937–2019), founder and chair of the Tampa Bay Rays.
 Peggy Noonan (born 1950), columnist, author and former speechwriter for Ronald Reagan.
 Christine O'Donnell (born 1969), 2010 Republican nominee for U.S. Senator from Delaware.
 Gregory Olsen (born 1945), entrepreneur and astronaut.
 Mel Schrieberg (1942–2017), co-founder of Election.com, running the only major public sector election ever run on the Internet, the Arizona Democratic primary in March 2000.
 John Spencer, actor known for his role on The West Wing (did not graduate).
 Dennis Strigl (born 1946), president and COO of Verizon Communications.
 Stephen Spiro, Vietnam War opponent, conscientious objector, received pardon by Gerald Ford.
 Guy Talarico, member of the New Jersey General Assembly.
 Rahshon Turner (born 1975), basketball player
 Jeff Van Drew (born 1953), member of the U.S. House of Representatives for New Jersey's second District.
 Ben Weinman (born 1975), founding lead guitarist of The Dillinger Escape Plan.
 Sara Whalen (born 1976), Olympic soccer player
 Zygi Wilf (born 1950), billionaire real estate developer and owner of the Minnesota Vikings football team.
 Perry Williams (born 1961), cornerback who played in the NFL for the New York Giants.
 Bill Willoughby (born 1957), retired NBA professional, who earned his FDU degree after skipping college and playing in the NBA.
 Darren Young, professional wrestler formerly working for WWE.
 Gerald H. Zecker (born 1942), politician who served as Deputy Speaker of the New Jersey General Assembly.

Notable faculty
Seth Roland is the head coach of the Fairleigh Dickinson men's soccer team, a position he has held since 1997, and was named 2000 Northeast Conference Men's Soccer Coach of the Year.  As of 2022, he was the winningest coach in FDU men's soccer history, the winningest coach in Northeast Conference history, and the ninth active-winningest-coach in NCAA Division I.

References

External links

 

 
Educational institutions established in 1942
Universities and colleges in Morris County, New Jersey
Private universities and colleges in New Jersey
Florham Park, New Jersey
Hackensack, New Jersey
Madison, New Jersey
Teaneck, New Jersey
Sports in Bergen County, New Jersey
1942 establishments in New Jersey
Private universities and colleges in Canada
Universities and colleges in British Columbia
Universities and colleges in Bergen County, New Jersey